Rovaniemen Palloseura (RoPS) is a football club founded in 1950 and based in Rovaniemi, Finland. In 2019 RoPS participated in the Finnish Premier Division, (Veikkausliiga) marking their 32nd season in the top flight (previously called "Veikkausliiga") since 1981. The club plays home games at the Rovaniemen Keskuskenttä in the Arctic Circle of Lapland.
The closest affiliated team is RoPS/2 from Kakkonen who participates in the third tier of Finnish football.

History

RoPS have won the Finnish Cup on two occasions, in 1986 and 2013, and were runners-up in 1962. They placed third in the Finnish Premier Division in 1988 and 1989, before finishing as runner-up in 2015, losing out on the title by 1 point to eventual champions SJK. The club's most notable international achievement was reaching the quarter-finals of the European Cup-Winners' Cup in 1987–88 against Marseille.

Match fixing allegations and scandal
Throughout the 2000s, RoPS became infamous for suspected involvement in match fixing.

In spring 2011 the Finnish National Bureau of Investigation started a large investigation into match fixing. On February 25 Singaporean businessman Wilson Raj Perumal, a convicted match fixer, was arrested after entering Finland with a fake passport. The National Bureau of Investigation suspected that over 30 games between 2008 and 2011, mostly from the Finnish premier league, had been fixed or manipulated.

On July 19, 2011, the Rovaniemi Court of Appeal convicted Perumal and nine RoPS players of match-fixing. Altogether 24 games had been manipulated, and the intended score had been achieved in 11 of them. Perumal was sentenced to two years in prison and ordered to return 150,000 euros deemed to be match-fixing profits. The bribes ranged from 500 euros offered to one player to a total of 80,000 euros offered to eight players. The highest total of bribes for one individual was slightly over 40,000 euros. The players received suspended sentences. The sentenced players were six Zambian and two Georgian players: Godfrey Chibanga, Chileshe Chibwe, Francis Kombe, Stephen Kunda, Christopher Musonda, Chanda Mwaba, Nchimunya Mweetwa, Pavle Khorguashvili, and Valter Khorguashvili.

Domestic history

European history

Notes
 1R: First round
 2R: Second round
 1Q: First qualifying round
 QF: Quarter-finals

Honours
Finnish Cup
Champions (2): 1986, 2013

Ykkönen
Champions (2): 2010, 2012

Current squad

Management and boardroom

Management
As of 18 February 2020.

Boardroom
As of 18 February 2020

Rovaniemi Football Academy 
Rovaniemi Football Academy (RFA) is the reserve team of RoPS. The team plays in Kakkonen in 2020 season. It is coached by Aleksi Tanner.

Managers

 Jerzy Masztaler (1990–91)
 Graham Williams (1991)
 Olavi Tammimies (1992)
 Keith Armstrong (1993–94)
 Timo Salmi (1995)
 Graham Williams (1995)
 Ari Matinlassi (1995)
 Ari Rantamaa (1996–97)
 Kari Virtanen (1997–99)
 Olavi Tammimies (2000)
 Mauri Holappa (2001)
 Tomi Molin (2002)
 György Hamori (Jan 1, 2003 – June 23, 2004)
 Mika Lumijärvi (June 23, 2004 – June 30, 2005)
 Matti Vikman (interim) (June 30, 2005 – Dec 31, 2005)
 Jukka Ikäläinen (2006)
 Tom Saintfiet (Jan 1, 2008 – April 7, 2008)
 Valeri Bondarenko (April 14, 2008 – May 27, 2009)
 Mika Lumijärvi (May 27, 2009 – Oct 6, 2009)
 Zeddy Saileti (Oct 6, 2009 – Dec 31, 2009)
 John Allen (Jan 1, 2010 – Aug 9, 2011)
 Matti Hiukka (Aug 9, 2011 – Dec 31, 2011)
 Kari Virtanen (Jan 1, 2012 – Oct 13)
 Juha Malinen (Nov, 2013 – Oct, 2017)
 Toni Koskela (Oct, 2017 – May 22, 2019)
 Pasi Tuutti (May 22, 2019– )

References

External links
Official website 

 
Football clubs in Finland
Association football clubs established in 1950
Rovaniemi
1950 establishments in Finland